Philip Douglas,  D.D. (27 October 1758 – 2 January 1822) was a British priest and academic in the second half of the eighteenth century and the first decades of the 19th.

Douglas was born at Witham, Essex, the son of Archibald Douglas of Kirkton and his wife Elizabeth Burchard, and went to Harrow School. He was a student at Corpus Christi College, Cambridge, graduating B.A. in 1781; MA in 1784; and B.D. in 1793. He was appointed Fellow in 1782; Tutor in 1787 and Master in 1795. He was Vice-Chancellor of the University of Cambridge from 1795 to 1796; and again from 1810 to 1811. He was ordained in 1783 and served his title at Whittlesford. He was vicar of Gedney from 1796 until his death.

References   

People educated at Harrow School
Alumni of Corpus Christi College, Cambridge
Fellows of Corpus Christi College, Cambridge
Masters of Corpus Christi College, Cambridge
18th-century English Anglican priests
19th-century English Anglican priests
1822 deaths
1758 births
People from Essex
Vice-Chancellors of the University of Cambridge